

Organizations
GajanBrand (founded in 2014), an American Streetwear brand, founded by Devin Gajan Williams

Communes

Gajan is the name of 2 communes in France:

 Gajan, Ariège, in the Ariège department
 Gajan, Gard, in the Gard department

Festivals
 Gajan (festival), a Hindu festival celebrated mostly in the Indian state of West Bengal

People
 Hokie Gajan (1959–2016), an American football player and broadcaster
 Dev Gajan (1996), an American hip-hop musician